Stardust is a 1938 British musical comedy film directed by Melville W. Brown and starring Lupe Velez, Ben Lyon and Wallace Ford. Production began in November 1936 at the Rock Studios in Elstree. The film's sets were designed by the art director George Provis. It is also known by the alternative titles Mad About Money and He Loved an Actress.

Synopsis
In order to grab some headlines a rumba dancer pretends to be a South American heiress. She takes in an aspiring independent film producer who tries to persuade her to invest in his first screen production. As each bluffs the other film moves towards completion.

Cast
 Lupe Velez as 	Carla de Huelva
 Ben Lyon as 	Roy Harley
 Wallace Ford as 	Peter Jackson
 Jean Colin as Diana West
 Harry Langdon as 	Otto Schultz
 Mary Cole as 	Peggy
 Cyril Raymond as 	Jerry Sears
 Ronald Ward as 	Eric Williams
 Arthur Finn as 	J.D. Meyers
 Philip Pearman as 	Prince
 Andreas Malandrinos as 	Ambassador
 Olive Sloane as Gloria Dane
 Peggy Novak as 	Secretary
 John Stobart as Headwaiter
 Albert Whelan as 	Judge
 Ronald Hill as 	District Attorney
 Alan Shires as 	Dance Partner

References

Bibliography
 Low, Rachael. Filmmaking in 1930s Britain. George Allen & Unwin, 1985.
 Wood, Linda. British Films, 1927-1939. British Film Institute, 1986.

External links

1938 films
British comedy films
1938 comedy films
Films directed by Melville W. Brown
Films shot at Rock Studios
British black-and-white films
1930s English-language films
1930s British films
Grand National Films films